Ollie W. Reed Sr. (July 18, 1896 – July 30, 1944) was a soldier in the United States Armed Forces and an American football coach. He served as the head football coach at Drexel University in Philadelphia for one season, in 1926, compiling a record of 2–5. He was also a professor of military history at the school.

Reed died on July 30, 1944 in the French community of Villebaudon during the aftermath of the Battle of Normandy.

Head coaching record

References

External links
 

1896 births
1944 deaths
Drexel Dragons football coaches
Drexel University faculty
Kansas State University alumni
United States Army personnel killed in World War II
United States Army officers
People from Norton, Kansas